Estación San Fernando,  is a railway station of the Empresa de los Ferrocarriles del Estado, located in San Fernando, Chile . It is the main railway station in the Colchagua Province. It is located on Quechereguas avenue.

Estación San Fernando is part of the Red Sur EFE, the TerraSur inter-city service has a stop here. Metrotrén commuter service terminate at this station.

The Ramal Pichilemu diverge from here, originally to the city of Pichilemu (railway station) but the line was closed on 1987, operating today as far as Estación Peralillo.

The steam locomotive hauled, Tren del Vino (Wine Train), is a turistic train that operates every Saturday between Estación San Fernando and Estación Paniahue (in Santa Cruz).

The nearby San Fernando Bus Terminal is within walking distance from the Station.

Lines and trains 
The following lines and trains pass through or terminate at Estación San Fernando:

Red Sur EFE
TerraSur inter-city service (Alameda - Estación Chillán)
Alameda-Temuco train inter-city service (Alameda - Estación Temuco)
Ramal Pichilemu
Tren del Vino turistic service (Estación San Fernando - Estación Paniahue)

Adjacent stations

External links 
 Empresa de los Ferrocarriles del Estado
 Metrotrén
 Tren del Vino

San Fernando
Buildings and structures in O'Higgins Region
Transport in O'Higgins Region